Palmberg is a Swedish surname, used also in Finland. Notable people with the surname include:

Jan-Ove Palmberg (born 1943), Swedish engineer
Johannes Palmberg ( 1640–1691), Swedish botanist, physician, and priest

Swedish-language surnames
Finland Swedish surnames